The Changsha Open is a tournament for professional female tennis players played on outdoor clay courts. The event is classified as a $60,000 ITF Women's Circuit tournament and has been held in Changsha, China, since 2019.

Past finals

Singles

Doubles

External links 
 ITF search

ITF Women's World Tennis Tour
Recurring sporting events established in 2019
Clay court tennis tournaments
Tennis tournaments in China